Brachylia terebroides is a moth in the family Cossidae. It was described by Felder in 1874. It is found in Kenya, Namibia and South Africa.

The larvae have been recorded feeding on Acacia karroo.

References

Natural History Museum Lepidoptera generic names catalog

Cossinae
Moths described in 1874
Moths of Africa